Freshness Burger, often referred to simply as Freshness, is a chain fast food restaurant in Japan. Freshness Burger was established under American Creation Co., Ltd, which was founded in June of 1981. The first Freshness Burger restaurant opened in December of 1992 in Tomigaya.  

Freshness Burger currently operates under Freshness Burger Co., Ltd. which was established on November 1, 2016. The current CEO is Kentaro Saito. Freshness is headquartered in Kanagawa.

Freshness Burger sells hamburgers, sandwiches, salads, and coffee drinks. As of January 2, 2018, there are 167 stores open under the name Freshness Burger, and 47 under the name Freshness.

Slogan 
"Burger cafe where adults can relax that proposes a high-quality eating habit"

See also
 List of hamburger restaurants

References

External links
Official corporate website
Official retail website

Fast-food hamburger restaurants
Fast-food chains of Japan
Food and drink companies based in Tokyo
Retail companies based in Tokyo
Japanese restaurants
Restaurants in Japan
Restaurants established in 1992
1992 establishments in Japan